Mix It Up: Jump5 Remixed is a remix album by Christian pop group Jump5. It was released on April 6, 2004. It includes nine remixes of songs from their previous studio albums (excluding their Christmas album, All the Joy in the World), three tracks containing in-studio audio of the group, and a cover of Kool & the Gang's "Celebration", which is slightly different from the original version of their cover previously released on the Kim Possible soundtrack.

Mix It Up charted at #3 on Billboard'''s Top Dance/Electronic Albums chart in 2004.

 Track listing 

 Tracks 14 through 24 are between five and six seconds in length each, totaling 48 seconds between "Celebration" and the hidden track.

 Personnel 
Credits adapted from the liner notes of Mix It Up''.
Jump5 – vocals
Chris Fedun
Brandon Hargest
Brittany Hargest
Libby Hodges
Lesley Moore
Mark Hammond – original production

References 

Jump5 albums
2004 remix albums
Sparrow Records remix albums
Christian music remix albums